Gian van Veen (born 23 April 2002) is a Dutch professional darts player who competes in Professional Darts Corporation events.

Career
On 4 November 2022, van Veen reached the final of a Players Championship event, losing 4–8 to Gerwyn Price in the final.

On 16 November 2022, it was announced that Peter Wright had pulled out of competing in the 2022 Players Championship Finals, with van Veen as the first reserve, taking his place.

On 15 January 2023, he won a two-year PDC Tour Card via the Order of Merit at Q-School.

Performance timeline

PDC European Tour

References

External links
Gian van Veen - Darts WDF
Gian van Veen - Mastercaller

2002 births
Living people
Dutch darts players
Professional Darts Corporation current tour card holders